Worsley-Burnette House is a historic plantation house located near Conetoe, Edgecombe County, North Carolina. The original section was built about 1830, as a two-story, hall-and-parlor plan, Federal style frame dwelling. It was expanded about 1850 with a Greek Revival style end wing.

It was listed on the National Register of Historic Places in 1990.

References

Plantation houses in North Carolina
Houses on the National Register of Historic Places in North Carolina
Federal architecture in North Carolina
Greek Revival houses in North Carolina
Houses completed in 1830
Houses in Edgecombe County, North Carolina
National Register of Historic Places in Edgecombe County, North Carolina
1830 establishments in North Carolina